Below is a list of Honorary Freemen of the City of Birmingham.

List
The City of Birmingham, England has granted Honorary Freedom to individuals and military organisations since 1888. Designation as a Freeman of the City is an honorary title and, subject to a two-thirds majority of the Council, is granted to persons of distinction and those who have rendered eminent services to the City. The following have received this honour (up to 1998):

Notes

References
Birmingham Post and Mail Yearbook and Who's Who, 1998, Kinslea Press, 1998. .
History of Birmingham – Volume II, Asa Briggs, Oxford University Press, 1952.

Birmingham
Honorary Freedom
Birmingham, West Midlands-related lists
Birmingham, Honorary Freedom